Ameles persa is a species of praying mantis found in Afghanistan and Iran. Ameles crassinervis, which was previously thought to be a separate species, was synonymised in 2011.

References

persa
Mantodea of Asia
Insects of Afghanistan
Insects of Iran
Insects described in 1911
Taxa named by Ignacio Bolívar